Tetraclaenodon was a genus of small and early ungulate mammals that was part of the Phenacodontidae family.

References

Condylarths
Prehistoric mammal genera
Fossil taxa described in 1892
Paleocene mammals of North America